Peter Philip Smith OAM is an Australian former radio and television voice-over artist. He is primarily known for his work with GTV-9 Melbourne as their announcer, including being the announcer on the nationally screened quiz show Sale of the Century for 21 years.

Life and career

Early life 
Smith was born in Melbourne, Victoria, and educated at Wesley College, Melbourne.

Radio
Upon leaving school, Smith joined the Australian Broadcasting Corporation as a messenger boy before progressing through the ranks to an announcer on the home service and Radio Australia.

On radio in the 1960s, Smith worked with radio station 3AK as a "good guy" and on Greater 3UZ as it was known during the 1970s. Since this time he has made guest appearances on comedy-based radio programs, including Get This and Tough Love which both aired on Triple M.

Television
As television was introduced into Australia, Smith performed the role of announcer and host for the weekly ABC TV television program Sports View Hit Parade, broadcast on Saturday afternoons.

On 11 April 1964, Smith took up a position at the local Melbourne Nine Network station GTV-9. There he worked on voice-overs and appeared on Graham Kennedy's light entertainment TV program In Melbourne Tonight (IMT), for which he presented commercials, appeared in comedy sketches and, on several occasions, acted as compere. From the mid-60s, following Bert Newton's transfer to a rival network, Smith took over as chief voice-over announcer at GTV-9, a position he would retain for around 40 years.

During his time at the network, Smith has also been seen as on-camera host for numerous specials, as well as working for a period in the seventies as a National Nine newsreader. He was also associated for many years with network personality Bert Newton on the long running New Faces talent show and on Newton's night-time variety program. During the late 1970s, Smith also hosted his own Tonight Show on NWS-9 in Adelaide, South Australia.

In 1979, Smith was awarded the Douglas Wilkie Medal for doing the least for Australian rules football in the fairest manner.

Staying with the Nine Network, Smith was involved with Ernie Sigley and Denise Drysdale on their weekday morning program Ernie & Denise. From 1980, Smith became the voice-over man for the popular quiz program Sale of the Century for 21 years until its ending in 2001. His announcement at the end of the show usually finished with the phrase "Pete Smith speaking".

He went on to become the spokesman for Australian retailer Copperart, appearing in numerous commercials during the 1980s and 1990s.

In the early 1990s, Smith made several appearances on The Late Show on ABC-TV, having formed an association with some members of the creators of the show, The D-Generation, when they filmed several ultimately rejected pilot episodes of programs at Nine. One of Smith's notable performances on The Late Show was performing the Aerosmith song "Dude Looks Like A Lady". He also made a guest appearance during the mid-1990s on the current affairs spoof Frontline, also created by former members of The D-Generation and screened on the ABC.

Smith's later roles with Nine were warming up and giving announcements to the studio audience for Bert's Family Feud and a Sale of the Century's revival, Temptation, although he did not appear on the show's broadcast (except for one episode in September 2007 to introduce a contestant, which included an on-camera appearance). In 2007, he was the announcer for Mick Molloy's short-lived The Nation. In 2011 he was the guest on the seventh episode of Tony Martin's comedy program The Joy of Sets.

Smith went back to TV in 2019, as he voiced Talkin' 'Bout Your Generation on the Nine Network for the winning present announcer in series 6.

Other works
In film he appeared in Crackerjack (as a passerby) and Bad Eggs (as a police officer). During the 1990s he was the voiceover man for television advertisements for the Australian homewares chain Copperart, and had a small stint on the ill-fated Nine Network variety show Micallef Tonight parodying his usual voice over work, announcing joke prizes for their game show segment (describing an ugly couch as "a welcome subtraction from any living-room" and guests' choice to fly by aeroplane with the question "why risk death by ballooning or being fired from a giant cannon when aeroplanes are available?") and insulting the contestants. He has played a similar role on Micallef's game show Talkin' 'Bout Your Generation.

He has also performed in cabaret with Tony Martin, Mick Molloy and Judith Lucy and released two nostalgic double CDs, Pete Smith Specialties: The Great British Dance Bands Of The Thirties and Pete Smith Specialties: The Great British Dance Bands Of The Forties, containing his favourite popular music featuring classic British dance bands of the 1930s and 1940s.

Community work
Smith is currently chairman and patron of the GTV Foundation.

He is also a life ambassador for Australia Day.

Awards
Medal of the Order of Australia, 14 June 2004. Awarded "for service to the community, particularly through voluntary promotional assistance to charitable organisations".

References

External links 
 Smith's 70th birthday celebration on TV Tonight]
 Smith biography on  Temptation website
 

Australian male voice actors
Australian television personalities
Australian male film actors
Radio and television announcers
Radio personalities from Melbourne
Douglas Wilkie Medal winners
Living people
People educated at Wesley College (Victoria)
Year of birth missing (living people)